Daniel William Lawrence (born 12 July 1997) is an English professional cricketer who plays internationally for the England Test cricket team. In domestic cricket, he represents Essex. Lawrence made his Test debut in 2021. He plays as a right-handed middle-order batsman, and occasional offbreak bowler.

Early, domestic and T20 career
Lawrence played his youth cricket at Chingford Cricket Club, where his father is groundsman. He used various batting techniques when playing youth cricket.

Lawrence made his first-class debut for Essex against Kent in April 2015. At the age of 17 years and 290 days, and in only his second first-class appearance, Lawrence made a century against Surrey becoming the third youngest batsmen to score a century in the County Championship. Lawrence's batting was instrumental in helping Essex win promotion to the County Championship First Division, and in their first season back in the upper division, to win the Championship in 2017. In 2017 was named the Cricket Writers' Club Young Cricketer of the Year,
and made his debut for England Lions.

Lawrence bowls off-spin with an unusual action.

In April 2022, he was bought by the London Spirit for the 2022 season of The Hundred.

Big Bash League
In November 2020, Lawrence joined the Brisbane Heat as an international recruit, replacing Tom Banton.

International career
In December 2015, Lawrence was named in England's squad for the 2016 Under-19 Cricket World Cup. In the first match of the tournament, Lawrence scored a match-winning 174 runs off 150 balls against Fiji, the highest score by an English batsman in a youth ODI.

Lawrence put in a man-of-the-match performance as the England Lions wrapped up a series win against a Cricket Australia XI in February 2020. He finished with 4-28, following a quickfire 50 not out in the first match of the series.

A fortnight later, Lawrence's fine form for the Lions continued with an impressive 190 runs and three wickets in a four-day tour match against the same opposition.

On 29 May 2020, Lawrence was named in a 55-man group of players to begin training ahead of international fixtures starting in England following the COVID-19 pandemic. On 17 June 2020, Lawrence was included in England's 30-man squad to start training behind closed doors for the Test series against the West Indies. On 4 July 2020, Lawrence was named as one of the nine reserve players for the first Test match of the series. However, on 10 August 2020, Lawrence had to leave the England bio-secure bubble after his mother died.

In December 2020, Lawrence was named in England's Test squad for their series against Sri Lanka. He made his international debut in the first Test of this series scoring an impressive 73 in the first innings before being caught at short leg.

Lawrence took his maiden international wicket of New Zealand's Will Young caught by Ollie Pope during day 2 of the England vs New Zealand second Test match.

In July 2021, Lawrence was named in England's ODI squad for their series against Pakistan, after the original squad for the tour was forced to withdraw following positive tests for COVID-19.

In November 2021, Lawrence was named in England's test squads for the 2021-22 Ashes series against Australia, however he played in no matches during the series that England would eventually lose 4–0.

In February 2022, Lawrence was named in England's test squad for their series against the West Indies. Before the series, he played in the England vs West Indies presidential XI where he would score 83 and 48 and take 2 wickets. The match would end in a draw. Lawrence reached a test best score of 91 in the Barbados test, before being caught on the final ball of day.

References

External links
 

1997 births
Living people
English cricketers
England Test cricketers
Essex cricketers
Marylebone Cricket Club cricketers
Karachi Kings cricketers
Brisbane Heat cricketers
London Spirit cricketers